The Revolution of 1851 (or Civil War of 1851) was an attempt by Chilean liberals to overthrow the conservative government of president Manuel Montt and repeal the Chilean Constitution of 1833. After various battles and sieges, by late December 1851 government forces had subdued the revolutionaries.

Background
After the Battle of Lircay ended the Chilean Civil War of 1829–30, Chile formed a conservative political system under the 1833 Constitution, drafted by Mariano Egaña, which established a one-party presidential polity. In the succeeding decades, various liberal social and political movements emerged, led by intellectuals like Santiago Arcos, Francisco Bilbao, José Victorino Lastarria and Benjamín Vicuña Mackenna. These and others formed institutions such as the Literary Society of 1842 and the Society of Equality, which sought to rally the population to achieve an increase in civil rights. During the 1840s many small newspapers began to appear in Chile such as, Guerra a la Tiranía, which used language that facilitated violence among liberal social groups throughout Chile. Other newspapers such as El Semanario and El Mercurio, two popular newspapers at the time, began to denounce these new slanderous newspapers such as Guerra a la Tiranía in order to stop their dangerous journalism from further dividing political parties. The European Revolutions of 1848 also inspired and encouraged opposition political movements, who increasingly saw armed action as the most realistic means of forcing political change.·

1851 Election and Uprisings

20 April uprising
In early 1851, the opposition advanced candidate José María de la Cruz in the presidential election to oppose then-president Manuel Bulnes's preferred successor, Manuel Montt. Concerned that the election might not end in their favor, Cruz and other opposition groups decided to attempt a military coup, to be carried out in Santiago by Colonel Pedro Urriola Balbontín.

At dawn on 20 April, Urriola and his companions seized the main streets of Santiago and stormed the army barracks to arm more men, but few of the soldiers they had hoped for joined in the uprising. Two loyalist battalions organized to face the rebels and prepared a counteroffensive from the Alameda and Santa Lucia Hill. The fighting lasted about five hours, after which Urriola was killed along with more than 200 others.

25–26 June presidential elections
When the government announced that Montt had won the election by a wide margin, Cruz accused the regime of electoral fraud and declared the election void. He also alleged that government agents were conspiring to assassinate him, but the men accused were acquitted by the Chilean courts. After that Cruz withdrew to Concepción from Santiago. Small protests began in Concepción, Coquimbo and Maule, which would gradually escalate into open rebellion. In the meantime, the government began arresting political opponents.

September uprisings
Days before Manuel Montt assumed power on 18 September 1851, dissident uprisings seized power in Concepción and La Serena. According to historian Alberto Edwards the uprising  was not only rooted in liberalism but also in provincialism.

The revolution in La Serena was led by Pedro Pablo Muñoz, the brothers Antonio and Ignacio Alfonso, and other notable residents of the city, who organized a revolutionary militia of 600 men from La Serena, Ovalle and Illapel. Calling themselves the "Restorers of the North," they were commanded by José Miguel Carrera Fontecilla. A revolutionary government was formed in the city, declaring the abolition of the Constitution of 1833. After a defeat by government forces in the Battle of Petorca, the city was besieged.

The uprising in Concepción, by contrast, had little to do with liberalism, as José María de la Cruz and other Concepción strongmen were pelucones (conservatives). Instead, historian Fernando Silva (1974) claims that the election of Montt meant the loss of the political hegemony Concepción had enjoyed in the 1829–1851 period under the presidents José Joaquín Prieto and Manuel Bulnes, both of whom were from that city. Because of this the Concepción elite would have supported the overthrow of the Montt regime. Cruz armed a group of four thousand men, including liberal supporters, rebel troops, mountaineers, and warriors of the Mapuche chieftain Mañil. According to historian José Bengoa, the Mapuches saw the central government in Santiago as their main enemy, explaining their participation on the side of Cruz in the Concepción-based revolt. Cruz had previously been in charge of the Army of the South and had helped to prevent a possible Mapuche-Chilean war arising from the wreck of Joven Daniel in 1849.

Later uprisings

On 28 October another uprising began in Valparaíso, led by artisans of the Society of Brotherhood (the surviving local chapter of Society of Equality). The Valparaíso mutiny was led by Rafael Bilbao and José Antonio Riquelme.

On 21 November a Chilean naval officer named José Miguel Cambiazo led a mutiny in Punta Arenas, which was eventually put down by the Chilean navy.

End of the revolution

Consequences of the Revolution
After the failure of the Revolution, the government of Montt began a program of political persecution against the instigators of the uprisings, led by his minister Antonio Varas, which included arrests and deportations. Dozens of notable government opponents were driven into exile, including Arcos, Bilbao, Lastarria and Vicuña Mackenna. Thousands more had died in the fighting.

A major rift developed within Chile's political opposition, dividing them into a group headed by Francisco Bilbao, who called for renewed armed revolution, and one headed by Aubrey, seeking a return to democracy by an institutional route.

References

Bibliography

Further reading
 
 

Chilean Revolution
Revolution
Conflicts in 1851
Revolutions in Chile
Military coups in Chile
Rebellions in Chile
1850s coups d'état and coup attempts